Ismael Rodríguez (October 19, 1917 – August 7, 2004) was a Mexican film director.

Rodríguez rose to fame due to the movies he directed starring Pedro Infante, and directed many major stars, including Dolores del Río, María Félix, Toshiro Mifune, Jorge Negrete, Sara García, Luis Aguilar, Tito Guízar, Gloria Marín, Carmelita González, Antonio Aguilar, Columba Domínguez or Flor Silvestre. He directed the film Ánimas Trujano (1961) for which he was nominated for an Oscar for Best Foreign Language Film.

Rodríguez's most renowned international film is Tizoc, in which Pedro Infante starred alongside María Félix. For this role, Infante won the Silver Bear for Best Actor at the 7th Berlin International Film Festival.

He died on 7 August 2004 at the age of 87.

Selected filmography

References

External links

1917 births
2004 deaths
Mexican film directors
Golden Ariel Award winners
People from Mexico City
Deaths from respiratory failure